Adriana Serra Zanetti (born 5 March 1976) is a retired Italian tennis player. 

On 11 February 2002, she achieved her career-high singles ranking of world No. 38. On 17 June 2002, she peaked at No. 69 in the doubles rankings. In her career, she won three WTA doubles titles, as well as one singles titles ITF.

Serra Zanetti reached one Grand Slam quarterfinal in singles, at the 2002 Australian Open.

Adriana Serra Zanetti was born Modena, and her younger sister Antonella who is also a tennis player.

Adriana Serra Zanetti retired from the professional tour 2007.

WTA finals

Doubles (3–1)

ITF Finals

Singles (1–3)

Doubles (0–4)

References

External links

 
 
 

1976 births
Living people
Italian female tennis players
Sportspeople from Modena